Robert P. Hoyt (born September 15, 1968) is a physicist and engineer who is known for his work developing the SpiderFab architecture for in-space additive manufacture of spacecraft as well as for his invention of the Hoytether. He also originated the MXER Tether concept, which combines momentum-exchange techniques with electrodynamic reboost propulsion to enable a bolo tether system to serve as a fully reusable in-space upper stage for boosting many payloads from LEO to GEO or lunar trajectories.  He also has done work and collaborated with the late Robert L. Forward on electrodynamic space tethers for use for deorbiting space junk and interplanetary transport. He was one of the authors of a paper on using tethers for cis-lunar transportation.  The Cooper Hewitt Smithsonian Design Museum included a Hoytether designed and fabricated by Hoyt in an exhibition on high-tech textiles.

In addition to his work on space tethers, Hoyt has pioneered methods for using additive manufacturing to create structures and components for spacecraft, both on the ground and in orbit, and has worked to develop self-fabricating satellites under funding from DARPA and NASA.  Hoyt also invented the Structureless Antenna technology, which uses electrostatic forces to deploy ultra-lightweight large-aperture antenna reflectors, enabling small spacecraft to deploy and use large, high-gain antennas.  Other projects he has been involved with are an invention to drain the Van Allen radiation belts, development of robotic arms for small spacecraft, and development of tether-based methods to enable tiny nanosatellites to capture and de-spin asteroids and space debris objects.

Hoyt is the CEO and Chief Scientist of Tethers Unlimited, Inc.

Hoyt also co-founded ScienceOps in 2007, a company that develops custom scientific algorithms and software for a wide range of industries, including biotech, online advertising, and aerospace.  ScienceOps was acquired by Acquisio in 2012.

External links
The Space Show: Interview with Hoyt retrieved 4th Jan 2010

References

Space scientists
American aerospace engineers
20th-century American inventors
21st-century American inventors
Living people
1968 births